Jacob J. Litza (August 29, 1880 – November 6, 1922) was an American businessman and politician.

Born in Milwaukee, Wisconsin, Litza served in Company "K" in the First Wisconsin Volunteers of the United States Army during the Spanish–American War. In 1910, Litza was appointed deputy sheriff for Milwaukee County, Wisconsin. He then became city agent for Miller Brewing Company and Jung Brewery Company. In 1913, Litza served in the Wisconsin State Assembly and was a Democrat. Litza then purchase a café and then became president of Berthelet Pipe and Supply Company. Litza died in a hospital in Milwaukee, Wisconsin.

Notes

1880 births
1922 deaths
American military personnel of the Spanish–American War
Military personnel from Wisconsin
Businesspeople from Wisconsin
20th-century American politicians
20th-century American businesspeople
Democratic Party members of the Wisconsin State Assembly